Glen Docherty is a glen in Wester Ross in Scotland, between Loch Maree and Kinlochewe to the west and Loch a'Chroisg and Achnasheen to the east.

The A832 road runs through the glen, which runs between the peaks of Càrn a' Ghlinne to the north and Carn Loisgte to the south. Until recently this was a single track road with passing places, but  of the road has now been upgraded to double track.

Formation
Volcanic activity in this region ceased about 50 million years ago, after which the landscape was shaped by glaciation from about 1.8 million years ago to the end of the Great Ice Age about 10,000 years ago. The U-shaped glen of Glen Docherty is typical of a glen formed by the action of glaciers.

References

Glens of Scotland
Valleys of Highland (council area)